The  is a high-rise commercial building located in Sangen-jaya, Setagaya, Tokyo, Japan. It was completed in November 1996. The building has 26 stories above ground and 5 basement levels. Its name was the winning entry in a competition among local children. 

The upper levels have office space, while the lower stories contain shops, a gallery, and a public theatre. The top floor has an observation deck along with a banquet area and restaurant. It also houses a broadcasting studio of the local FM Setagaya radio station. 

The game development company Game Freak hosted their headquarters on the 22nd floor of the Carrot Tower until transferring to Kanda Square in 2020. The site on the 22nd floor still serves as an alternative site development studio for Game Freak today.

Sangen-Jaya Station on the Tōkyū Setagaya Line is integrated into the ground floor.

References

External links
 Setagaya Public Theater (Japanese)
 FM Setagaya (Japanese)

Buildings and structures in Setagaya